South Chatham station was a train station located in South Chatham, Massachusetts. The station was built in 1887 by the Chatham Railroad Company when the line was extended beyond Harwich.

References

Chatham, Massachusetts
Old Colony Railroad Stations on Cape Cod
Stations along Old Colony Railroad lines
Former railway stations in Massachusetts